Commando is a series of Indian Hindi-language action thriller films produced by Vipul Amrutlal Shah under the banner of Sunshine Pictures. The film series is co-produced and distributed by Reliance Entertainment.

The first film Commando: A One Man Army was released in 2013 is directed by Dilip Ghosh, the second film Commando 2: The Black Money Trail released in 2017 is directed by Deven Bhojani while the third film Commando 3 is directed by Aditya Datt released in 2019. The series follows the story of an Indian Commando named Karanveer 'Karan' Singh Dogra (Vidyut Jammwal) and his missions.

The protagonist's name is inspired by Karan Singh, the Dogra dynasty ex-crown prince of Jammu and Kashmir. Jammwal, who is trained in the Indian martial arts of Kalaripayattu, performs his own stunts and martial arts in the film's action sequences. Commando 2 is the only film in the series to be released along with its Tamil and Telugu dubbed versions.

Overview

Commando: A One Man Army (2013)

Indian Commando Karanveer Singh Dogra "Karan" is captured by Chinese officials when his helicopter crashes on the Chinese border during a routine training. Karan and his seniors are unable to convince the Chinese of the former's innocence. The Chinese decide to brand Karan as a spy to defame India internationally. Feeling the Chinese won't comply, the Indian government order the Indian Army to erase Karan's record, identity and deny his existence. Karan is tortured for a year by the Chinese Army but later escapes while being taken to the Chinese Military Court. He runs into a woman named Simrit, who is running away from a man named AK-74 and his goons. Karan rescues her by fighting off the goons headed by AK-74's politician brother. He decides to escort Simrit out of the town for her safety but finds himself surrounded by AK-74 and his goons at a bridge. Outnumbered and outgunned, he jumps into the river along with Simrit who later explains AK-74 or Amrit Kanwal Singh wants to marry her for political gains. Moving to the woods, Karan and Simrit start to develop feelings for each other. They soon find themselves pursued by AK-74 and his goons, and Karan uses his martial arts skills to fight them off.

AK-74 hires special trackers and hunting dogs, who get a scent of Karan and Simrit from a torn piece of her shirt. Karan misleads the dogs and crosses a river. However, Karan is shot in the ensuing fight and eventually thrown into a river by AK-74. On the other hand, learning of Karan's entering India, an agent is sent to eliminate him. AK-74 kills Simrit's parents and stages it as an accident, eventually forcing Simrit to marry him. However, Karan is saved by some people who heal his wounds before he heads to the town. Karan invades AK-74's house and kills all his henchmen including his brother. Before he can confront AK-74, he faces the agent sent to kill him who joined hands with AK-74 to kill Karan. After another fight, Karan kills the agent and beats up AK-74. He publicly hangs him on the town square and surrenders to his commander Col. Akhilesh Sinha, who had arrived on time to save Karan from the local police working for AK. Karan finally reveals his full name to Simrit and promises to return after his court-martial.

Commando 2: The Black Money Trail (2017)

Commando Karanveer Singh Dogra "Karan" is skilled in many aspects of survival, weaponry, and hand-to-hand combat. He is on a mission to eradicate black money, which has been siphoned to banks along with his gang. He goes to Vicky Chaddha's house where during night time, his wife Maria reveals that they didn't have a life like this in the past. The film flashes to a flashback where his husband was forced to do all this because when he declined to do a negative job, the very next day, a bomb blast occurred where Vicky was saved but their daughter Tara died. Very soon, Maria kills her husband and says that she is the real Vicky Chaddha. Karan and his gang follow Vicky Chaddha and finally find her transferring money to an account. Karan beats up all the army in her team but doesn't stop the money transfer. It is then revealed that he changed the account in which the money was scheduled to the transferred and the replaced account which will help the poor people. He said this was planned on the very first day. When Vicky says that police cannot arrest her, Bhavna Reddy shoots Vicky and they get out of there. While Karan and Bhavna will be together, a phone call arrives where Karan says he is waiting for a new mystery to arrive.

Commando 3 (2019)

The Mumbai Police officers arrest 3 young terror suspects and try to interrogate them but get no information. Karanveer Singh Dogra "Karan" is called to help the police but one of the suspects kills himself. Upon investigating further, Karan learns the suspects received money and VHS tapes containing a terrorist's message. Also, one of the suspects talks repeatedly about 9/11, which is decoded as an attack on India on the day of Diwali. Further learning the recordings were shot by a camera in London, Karan decides to go undercover along with Bhavana Reddy, who assisted him on his previous mission. Posing as a married couple, they arrive in London where Mallika Sood, a British Intelligence officer picks them up and takes them to their work station where another agent named Armaan Akhtar assists them. On the other hand, the British Muslim terrorist Buraq Ansari forces his son Abeer to watch him killing a man, due to which Abeer's mother and Buraq's ex wife Zahira wants to contact the police but is threatened by Buraq. Learning two Indian agent have arrived in London possibly to capture him, Buraq enlists the help of his agents to track them while Karan and his team go through the same process to track Buraq's agents. While pursuing a suspect, Karan meets Zahira and Abeer, and soon gets involved in a bike chase with the suspect, resulting in the latter's accidental death. Karan retrieves his phone and answers Buraq's call, further telling him he would soon visit the dead suspect's house. Karan and team arrive at the house, but outside it are stopped by Buraq's goons. A fight breaks out, resulting in Karan getting thrown out of the house by an explosion. The video goes viral, and so does Bhavana's tweet supporting Karan.

It is soon revealed to be a part of Karan's plan when he releases a video of himself challenging Buraq without disclosing his identity. When Buraq's DNA matches with that of a murder suspect, Karan and his team rush to Buraq's restaurant but find him gone. Realizing he would have gone to pick up his son from school, Karan arrives there and challenges him before the latter disappears. Back in Mumbai, the two suspects are reformed by a Muslim saint. Buraq is unwilling to let go of his son and soon finds himself exposed when Karan holds a press conference with Abeer and Zahira. While the mother and son are being escorted safely to the airport for India, Buraq's henchmen attack the vehicles. Bhavana is knocked out in the crash while Karan and Mallika fight off the henchmen. However, Zahira and Abeer are kidnapped and Mallika is informed about Buraq's surrender. Karan tries to interrogate him but ends up using force due to which he is ordered to leave London within 24 hours. Buraq is freed due to making a deal with the BI; he gives them evidence for a previous attack in exchange for his freedom. On his way to a safe house, Buraq asks the officers to stop at a mosque so that he can pray. He switches places with one of his henchmen and kills Zahira. Realizing the attack would be not on Diwali but before it, Karan decides to continue alone but is joined by his team. Through Abeer's tablet, the safe house is located and attacked by Karan and team. Following the fight that leaves all the henchmen dead, Karan injects Buraq and takes him away as he is unconscious. Bhavana and Mallika rescue Abeer, while Karan is safely picked up by his agency's helicopter and escorted to a cargo ship heading towards India. With minimal time remaining for the attacks, Karan and the police try to find the targeted cities. Decoding "ALLAH" spoken repeatedly by Buraq, Karan finds the targeted cities and releases a video requesting the Muslims of India to understand the value of religious unity. When the good Muslims gear up to face the terrorists, they are joined by the police officers and terrorists are arrested. Karan kills Buraq, and hands over Abeer to the dead suspect's father.

Commando 4 (TBA)
On 19 June 2019, before the Release of Commando 3 the Producer of Commando franchise, Vipul Amrutlal Shah said, “The fact that we have been able to complete three films is satisfying. The franchise, in my mind, is set to become even bigger and I don’t think we will stop at three.” He added, “We have already identified the story which we want to tell with Commando 4, but for that, this film (Commando 3) needs to be a hit. We are confident that this one will give us the opportunity to do that.”

On 4 December 2019, after the success of Commando 3, Vidyut Jammwal said, “There was obviously pressure but then there was excitement as well. But I think we’re used to this style of life. Now, we have been discussing about how Vipul Amrutlal Shah wants to do Commando 4. "

Cast

Commando: A One Man Army
 Vidyut Jamwal as Commando Karanveer Singh Dogra (Karan)
 Pooja Chopra as Simrit Kaur
 Jaideep Ahlawat as Amrit Kanwal (AK-74)
 Jagat Rawat as MP Mahendra Pratap
 Darshan Jariwala as Colonel  Akhilesh Sinha, Karan's Commanding officer
 Baljinder Kaur
 Nathalia Kaur Special appearance (Item song) in "Mungda" song

Commando 2: The Black Money Trail
 Vidyut Jammwal as Commando Karanveer Singh Dogra (Karan)
 Adah Sharma as Inspector Bhavna Reddy
 Esha Gupta as Maria, later real Vicky Chaddha 
 Vansh Bharadwaj as Maria's husband and fake Vicky Chaddha
 Freddy Daruwala as ACP Bakhtawar Khan
 Suhail Nayyar as Dishank Chowdhury
 Thakur Anoop Singh as K.P
 Shefali Shah as Leena Chowdhury
 Satish Kaushik as Dhariwal Ranwal
 Ivan Rodrigues as Kamath
 Adil Hussain as Karan's Boss
 Kannan Arunachalam as Shrinath Iyer
 Siddharth Kher as Jimmy Kher
 Avisha Sharma as Tara
 Sumit Gulati as Zafar Hussain, the hacktivist
 Prince Rodde as Whisperer
 Jeet Raidutt as Vinay

Commando 3
 Vidyut Jammwal as Commando Karanveer Singh Dogra (Karan)
 Adah Sharma as Inspector Bhavna Reddy 
 Angira Dhar as British Intelligence Agent Mallika Sood 
 Gulshan Devaiah as Buraq Ansari
 Sumeet Thakur as British Intelligence Agent Armaan Akhtar
 Rajesh Tailang as Roy
 Virendra Saxena as Ahmed
 Vibhawari Deshpande as Rajani
 Feryna Wazheir as Zahira
 Suresh Vishwakarma as Inspector Tambe
 Abhilash Chaudhary as Taimur Khan
 Manuj Sharma as Subhan
 Raghav Dheer as Umar
 Prashant Jha as Usman
 Mark Bennington as Alvin
 Atharva Vishwakarma as Abeer
 R. Bhakti Klein as British Intelligence Agent

Cast and Characters

Crew

Release and revenue

References

Hindi-language thriller films